Renato Palma Veiga (born 29 July 2003) is a Portuguese football player who plays as a midfielder for Bundesliga club FC Augsburg, on loan from Primeira Liga club Sporting CP, and captains the Portugal national under-20 football team.

Early life 
Veiga was born in Lisbon, Portugal

Youth career 
A former youth player for Sporting CP, he resigned for them from Real S.C. in 2019.

Club career

Sporting CP 
Veiga made his debut for Sporting CP B against Cova Piedade U23 on 12 September 2020. On 31 October 2020, he scored his first goal against C.S. Marítimo U23.

FC Augsburg 
In January 2023, Veiga signed for FC Augsburg on loan until 31 December 2023. He made his Bundesliga debut on 11 February 2023 in a 1–3 defeat against Mainz 05.

International career
Veiga is a youth international for Portugal, having played up to the Portugal U20s.

Personal life
Veiga is the son of the Cape Verde international footballer Nélson Veiga.

Career statistics

Club

References

External links
 
 

2003 births
Living people
People from Lisbon
Portuguese footballers
Portugal youth international footballers
Portuguese sportspeople of Cape Verdean descent
Association football midfielders
Primeira Liga players
Sporting CP B players
FC Augsburg players